Esporte Clube Pinheiros, abbreviated as E.C. Pinheiros, is the professional women's volleyball team from the multi-sports club from the same name, based in São Paulo, São Paulo (state), Brazil.

Current squad
Squad for the season 2018–2019

Notable players
Macris Carneiro
Ana Carolina da Silva
Arlene Xavier
Danielle Lins 
Fernanda Ferreira
Fernanda Garay
Léia Silva
Tandara Caixeta
Rosamaria Montibeller

References

External links
Pinheiros Official Page

Volleyball
Volleyball clubs in São Paulo (state)
Brazilian volleyball clubs